Dear Mr. Brody is a 2021 documentary film directed and produced by Keith Maitland. The film centers on letters written to Michael James Brody Jr. (born October 31, 1948; died January 26, 1973) from the general public in response to Brody Jr.'s announcement (in early January 1970) that he would give away his inherited fortune (purported to be 25 million USD) to those in need.

Synopsis
When 21-year-old Brody Jr. (heir to the Jelke oleomargarine company) announced his intention to give away his inheritance to anyone in need, he ignited a spiral of events that captured the media's attention. Brody, along with his newlywed wife Renee, became instant world-wide celebrities who were then mobbed by the American public, scrutinized by the press, and overwhelmed by an avalanche of letters responding to his offer. Nearly fifty-years after  Brody Jr.'s death, a sampling of the enormous surviving unopened letters sent to him were opened for the camera, exposing a snapshot of America's hippie, communal, zeitgeist. In Maitland's follow-up to his 2016 mostly-animated documentary TOWER , he reveals the story of Brody Jr.  — and the countless people who sought his help — to create an exposé on desire, need, philanthropy, and love.

Release
The film had its virtual premiere at South by Southwest on March 16, 2021. The film's world premiere was scheduled for the Tribeca Film Festival in April 2020, but the festival was cancelled due to the COVID-19 pandemic. It was also selected to screen at the Telluride Film Festival in September 2020, prior to its cancellation. In October 2021, Discovery+ and Greenwich Entertainment were announced to have acquired distribution rights to the film. It is scheduled to be released on March 4, 2022, prior to streaming on Discovery+ on April 28, 2022.

Reception 
The film received generally positive reviews from critics. On the review aggregator website Rotten Tomatoes, 96% of 28 reviews are positive, with an average rating of 7.4/10. The website's critical consensus reads, "Dear Mr. Brody uses its stranger-than-fiction true story to take a touching look at how an act of kindness can reverberate for years." Metacritic, which uses a weighted average, assigned a score of 78 out of 100 based on eight critics, indicating "generally favorable reviews".

References

External links
 
 Michael Brody Jr. Letters at the Rare Book and Manuscript Library, Columbia University, New York, NY

2021 films
2021 documentary films
American documentary films
Films postponed due to the COVID-19 pandemic
Topic Studios films
2020s English-language films
2020s American films